Shafi Muhammad Jamot was a Pakistani politician who was a Member of the Provincial Assembly of Sindh from May 2013 to May 2018.

Personal life 

He was born on 10 May 1940 in Karachi, and died on 7 July 2019 also in Karachi.

Political career 

He was elected to the Provincial Assembly of Sindh as a candidate of Pakistan Muslim League (N) from Constituency PS-129 KARACHI-XLI in 2013 Pakistani general election.

References 

Living people
Sindh MPAs 2013–2018
1940 births
Pakistan Muslim League (N) politicians
People from Karachi